Beresford Neill Parlett (born 1932) is an English applied mathematician, specializing in numerical analysis and scientific computation.

Education and career
Parlett received in 1955 his bachelor's degree in mathematics from the University of Oxford and then worked in his father's timber business for three years. From 1958 to 1962 he was a graduate student in mathematics at Stanford University, where he received his Ph.D. in 1962. He was a postdoc for two years at Manhattan's Courant Institute and one year at the Stevens Institute of Technology. From 1965 until his retirement, he was a faculty member of the mathematics department at the University of California, Berkeley. There he served for some years as chair of the department of computer science, director of the Center for Pure and Applied Mathematics, and professor in the department of electrical engineering and computer science. He was a visiting professor at the University of Toronto, Pierre and Marie Curie University (Paris VI), and the University of Oxford.

Awards and honours
 2006 — (jointly with Inderjit S. Dhillon) SIAM Activity Group Linear Algebra Best Paper Prize
 2010 — Hans Schneider Prize in Linear Algebra
 2011 — Society for Industrial and Applied Mathematics (SIAM) Fellow

Selected publications

Articles

 arXiv preprint (See Bertram Kostant and Nolan Wallach.)

Books
 SIAM corrected edition of the original publication by Prentice-Hall in 1980

References

External links
 

Scientific computing researchers
Numerical analysts
1932 births
Living people
Alumni of the University of Oxford
Stanford University alumni
University of California, Berkeley faculty